The men's javelin throw event at the 1992 World Junior Championships in Athletics was held in Seoul, Korea, at Olympic Stadium on 16 and 18 September.

Medalists

Results

Final
The final took place on September 18, and the tournament table is below:

Qualifications
16 Sep

Group A

Group B

Participation
According to an unofficial count, 23 athletes from 19 countries participated in the event.

References

Javelin throw
Javelin throw at the World Athletics U20 Championships